The Central Region Army Group,  (GERC), was a military formation of the Spanish Republican Army during the last phase of the Spanish Civil War. It gathered the most powerful section of the republican military and would endure until the 1939 surrender. The GERC was under the command of general José Miaja Menant, the Defence of Madrid hero.

History 

The Central Region Army Group was established on 16 April 1938 by means of an order of the general Staff of the Popular Republican Army. It sought to reorganize the Republican forces following the disastrous campaigns of the Aragon Offensive and the splitting of the Spanish Republican territory in two by the rebel faction.
It was initially named "Group of Armies of the Central-Southern Zone" (Agrupación de Ejércitos de la Zona Centro-Sur) before being renamed as Central Region Army Group. At the time of its establishment it was composed by four armies, the Andalusian Army (Ejército de Andalucía), the Extremaduran Army (Ejército de Extremadura), Central Army (Ejército del Centro) and Levantine Army (Ejército de Levante), as well as 16 Army corps, 49 divisions and 138 mixed brigades. It also included a Coastal Defence brigade and the two anti-aircraft artillery brigades of the Defensa Contra Aeronaves (DCA).

In June the same year, the Eastern Region Army Group Grupo de Ejércitos de la Región Oriental (GERO) would be established as well.
In December 1938 the GERC was scheduled to take part in General Vicente Rojo Lluch's "Plan P", an ambitious project of an offensive campaign in Extremadura that would have taken place at the same time as a disembarkment within the enemy lines in Motril, along with diversionary attacks in other places of Andalusia and the Madrid Front. However, in the face of the opposition of General Miaja and other Republican commanders to the implementation of the whole plan, it was not carried out to its full extent and the only action taken was the Battle of Valsequillo which resulted in failure shortly before having been initiated.

Following the fall of Catalonia in February, on 2 March 1939 President Juan Negrín arranged for a reorganization of the Republican Armed Forces in the Central Zone, decreeing the disbandment of the GERC, as well as a reorganization of the command structure. However, Segismundo Casado's coup that took place a few days later would hinder the implementation of these eleventh-hour measures.

Structure

See also
Spanish Civil War, 1938–39
Final offensive of the Spanish Civil War
Eastern Region Army Group Grupo de Ejércitos de la Región Oriental (GERO)

References

Bibliography 
 Alpert, Michael (1989); El Ejército Republicano en la Guerra Civil, Siglo XXI de España, Madrid.
 Engel Masoliver, Carlos (1999); Historia de las Brigadas mixtas del Ejército popular de la República, 1936-1939, Editorial Almena, Madrid, 1999 .

 Salas Larrazábal, Ramón (2006); Historia del Ejército Popular de la República. La Esfera de los Libros S.L. 
 Thomas, Hugh (1976); Historia de la Guerra Civil Española. Círculo de Lectores, Barcelona..

Military units and formations of the Spanish Civil War
Armed Forces of the Second Spanish Republic
Army groups of Spain
Military units and formations established in 1938
Military units and formations disestablished in 1939